Nation and Destiny is a 62-part North Korean film series released between 1992 and 2002. It aims to show that the Korean people "can live a glorious life only in the bosom of the Great Leader and socialist fatherland". Kim Jong-il personally chose the title and was extensively involved in the early episodes. Conceived as the largest film series ever produced in any country, it was the largest investment ever made in the history of North Korean cinema. Initially, the most senior writers, directors and actors were involved in the project and it was heavily promoted by the North Korean media. The series was projected to reach 100 episodes, but none have been released since 2002.

The film is notable for its scenes set in the West and South Korea, some of which were even filmed on location in western countries that are not officially at war with North Korea (such as France). Also noteworthy is its portrayal of the "anti-system figure" Han Sorya, who was purged in the 1960s by Kim Il-sung, in a positive role. This was the first time that an "anti-system figure" has been portrayed as the hero on North Korean screen. The use of South Korean popular songs was part of a "mosquito-net strategy", whereby it was hoped the North Korean public would be immunised to the culture of the outside world by gradual exposure. According to defectors' testimony, North Korean audiences were engrossed by its depiction of First World affluence.

Synopsis
 Parts 1–4 were based on the life of Choe Deok-sin
 Parts 5–8 were based on the life of Isang Yun
 Parts 9–13 were based on the life of Choi Hong Hi
 Parts 14–16 were based on the life of Ri In-mo
 Parts 17–19 were based on the life of Ho Jong-suk
 Parts 20–25 were based on the life of naturalized Japanese women, including Rim Un-jong (Izumi Kiyoshi)
 Parts 26–36 were based on the life of workers
 Parts 46–51 were based on the life of Choe Hyon
 Parts 52–60 were based on the life of people past, present and future across generations
 Parts 61–62 were based on the life of peasants

Part list 
Some parts are said to be censored, as they were not aired on television during chronological airings of the series. Days where a censored part was to be aired featured a regular film until a non-censored part was scheduled to air. As they are censored, information on their creative staff is also unknown. Other films including the series Unsung Heroes have been censored during the transition of power between Kim Jong Il and Kim Jong Un.

References

Works cited

External links
"Nation and Destiny": the North Korean serial drama with the secret to unification by Tatiana Gabroussenko  at NK News

1990s Korean-language films
North Korean drama films
Kim Jong-il